Héctor Macchiavello (21 September 1903 – date of death unknown) was a Uruguayan footballer who played as a goalkeeper. He was part of Uruguay national team which won 1935 South American Championship.

Career statistics

International

Titles
  Uruguay 1935 Copa América

References

External links
 Uruguay 1935 Profile at Terra.com (Brazil)  Profile at

1903 births
Year of death missing
Uruguayan footballers
Uruguayan expatriate footballers
Uruguay international footballers
Racing Club de Montevideo players
Audax Italiano footballers
Expatriate footballers in Chile
Copa América-winning players

Association football goalkeepers